Jim Hackworth is a former Democratic member of the Tennessee House of Representatives, for the 33rd district, from 2003 to 2011.

Career
In 2002, Jim Hackworth was elected as State Representative to the General Assembly for the 33rd district, defeating Republican Steve Mead in a narrow victory. Hackworth went on to win re-election in 2004, 2006, and 2008.

Hackworth lost re-election against Republican John Ragan, in 2010.

In 2012, Hackworth ran for the 33rd district election, to reclaim his seat. He lost to John Ragan in the general election.

Personal life
Hackworth lives in Clinton, Tennessee, he has a wife and two children.

References

External links

1951 births
Living people
Democratic Party members of the Tennessee House of Representatives
21st-century American politicians
People from Clinton, Tennessee